In mathematics, Koszul duality, named after the French mathematician Jean-Louis Koszul, is any of various kinds of dualities found in representation theory of Lie algebras, abstract algebras (semisimple algebra) and topology (e.g., equivariant cohomology). The prototype example, due to Joseph Bernstein, Israel Gelfand, and Sergei Gelfand, is the rough duality between the derived category of a symmetric algebra and that of an exterior algebra. The importance of the notion rests on the suspicion that Koszul duality seems quite ubiquitous in nature.

Koszul duality for modules over Koszul algebras
The simplest, and in a sense prototypical case of Koszul duality arises as follows: for a 1-dimensional vector space V over a field k, with dual vector space , the exterior algebra of V has two non-trivial components, namely

whose differential is induced by natural evaluation map

Choosing a basis of V,  can be identified with the polynomial ring in one variable, and the previous chain complex becomes isomorphic to the complex

whose differential is multiplication by t. This computation shows that the cohomology of the above complex is 0 at the left hand term, and is k at the right hand term. In other words, k (regarded as a chain complex concentrated in a single degree) is quasi-isomorphic to the above complex, which provides a close link between the exterior algebra of V and the symmetric algebra of its dual.

Koszul dual of a Koszul algebra
Koszul duality, as treated by Alexander Beilinson, Victor Ginzburg, and Wolfgang Soergel can be formulated using the notion of Koszul algebra. An example of such a Koszul algebra A is the symmetric algebra  on a finite-dimensional vector space. More generally, any Koszul algebra can be shown to be a quadratic algebra, i.e., of the form

The Koszul dual then coincides with the quadratic dual

where  is the (k-linear) dual and  consists of those elements on which the elements of R (i.e., the relations in A) vanish. Its opposite ring is given by the graded ring of self-extensions of the underlying field k, thought of as an A-module:

Koszul duality
If an algebra  is Koszul, there is an equivalence between certain subcategories of the derived categories of graded - and -modules. These subcategories are defined by certain boundedness conditions on the grading vs. the cohomological degree of a complex.

Variants
Usually these quotients are larger than the derived category, as they are obtained by factoring out some subcategory of the category of acyclic complexes, but they have the advantage that every complex of modules determines some element of the category, without needing to impose boundedness conditions.

An extension of Koszul duality to D-modules states a similar equivalence of derived categories between dg-modules over the dg-algebra  of Kähler differentials on a smooth algebraic variety X and the -modules.

Koszul duality for operads
An extension of the above concept of Koszul duality was formulated by Ginzburg and Kapranov who introduced the notion of a quadratic operad and defined the quadratic dual of such an operad.  Very roughly, an operad is an algebraic structure consisting of an object of n-ary operations for all n. An algebra over an operad is an object on which these n-ary operations act. For example, there is an operad called the associative operad whose algebras are associative algebras, i.e., depending on the precise context, non-commutative rings (or, depending on the context, non-commutative graded rings, differential graded rings). Algebras over the so-called commutative operad are commutative algebras, i.e., commutative (possibly graded, differential graded) rings. Yet another example is the Lie operad whose algebras are Lie algebras. The quadratic duality mentioned above is such that the associative operad is self-dual, while the commutative and the Lie operad correspond to each other under this duality.

Koszul duality for operads states an equivalence between algebras over dual operads. The special case of associative algebras gives back the functor  mentioned above.

See also 
Zinbiel algebra

Notes

References 
Priddy, Stewart B. Koszul resolutions.  Transactions of the American Mathematical Society  152 (1970), 39–60.

External links 
http://www.math.harvard.edu/~lurie/282ynotes/LectureXXIII-Koszul.pdf
http://people.mpim-bonn.mpg.de/geordie/Soergel.pdf
http://arxiv.org/pdf/1109.6117v1.pdf

Algebras
Duality theories